Jordan Miller (born February 8, 1997) is an American football cornerback for the Arlington Renegades of the XFL. He played college football at Washington. During his four years at Washington he compiled six interceptions and 18 pass deflections.

Professional career

Atlanta Falcons
Miller was drafted by the Atlanta Falcons in the fifth round (172nd overall) of the 2019 NFL Draft. On December 26, 2019, the NFL announced that Miller was suspended for four games for violating the league’s performance-enhancing substance policy. This suspension covered week 17 of the 2019 NFL season and the first three weeks of the 2020 season. He was reinstated from the 2020 portion of his suspension and activated on September 28, 2020. He was placed on injured reserve on November 7, 2020, with an oblique injury. He was designated to return from injured reserve on December 2, and began practicing with the team again. However, on December 22, 2020, Miller was waived from the injured reserve.

Seattle Seahawks
On January 6, 2021, Miller was signed to the Seattle Seahawks practice squad. On January 11, 2021, Miller signed a reserve/futures contract with the Seahawks. He was waived on August 16, 2021.

New Orleans Saints
On September 6, 2021, Miller was signed to the New Orleans Saints practice squad. He was promoted to the active roster on September 11, 2021. He was waived on September 13 and re-signed to the practice squad. He was promoted back to the active roster on September 18. He was released on September 20 and re-signed to the practice squad. He signed a reserve/future contract with the Saints on January 11, 2022. He was waived on July 26, 2022.

Buffalo Bills
On July 30, 2022, Miller signed with the Buffalo Bills. He was released on August 29, 2022. He was re-signed to the practice squad on October 4. He was released on November 1.

Arizona Cardinals
On December 28, 2022, Miller signed with the practice squad of the Arizona Cardinals.

References

External links
Washington bio
Atlanta Falcons bio

1997 births
Living people
American football cornerbacks
Arizona Cardinals players
Atlanta Falcons players
Buffalo Bills players
New Orleans Saints players
Players of American football from California
Seattle Seahawks players
Sportspeople from Oceanside, California
Washington Huskies football players